Hossein Saki is an Iranian football defender who plays for Sanat Naft in the Persian Gulf Pro League.

References

External links
 Hossein Saki  PersianLeague.com 
 Hossein Saki at FmDataba
Hossein Saki  on instagram 
 Hossein Saki at soccerpunter.com
 
 
 Hossein Saki  https://www.teammelli.com/

1997 births
Living people
Iranian footballers
Foolad FC players
Esteghlal Ahvaz players
Sanat Naft Abadan F.C. players
Sportspeople from Khuzestan province
Association football defenders
Iran under-20 international footballers